Columbus Tower, also known as the Sentinel Building, is a mixed-use building in San Francisco, California, completed in 1907. The distinctive copper-green Flatiron style structure is bounded by Columbus Avenue, Kearny Street, and Jackson Street; straddling the North Beach, Chinatown, and Financial District neighborhoods of the city. Much of the building is occupied by film studio American Zoetrope, and the ground floor houses a cafe named after the company. The Sentinel Building is listed as San Francisco Designated Landmark No. 33.

History
The building was designed by the architecture firm Salfield and Kohlberg, named for architects David Salfield and Hermann Kohlberg.

Despite the 1907 finish, building work had begun before the San Francisco earthquake the previous year, but extensive damage to the building site, and the rest of the city, slowed down the construction considerably. For a relatively small building such as Sentinel Building, with the extensive workforce available in San Francisco at that time, taking more than a year to complete the building was slightly longer than would have been expected.

The top floor initially housed the headquarters of the notorious Abe Ruef, a local political figure at the time.

In 1949 or 1950, the nightclub hungry i, which would become very influential in the history of stand-up comedy in the US, was opened as an 83-seat venue in the Sentinel Building's basement by Eric Nord, who sold it to Enrico Banducci in 1951. After operating it as a venue for folk singers including Stan Wilson, Banducci began hiring comedians in 1953 with Mort Sahl, encouraging them to express themselves freely. Their success caused queues around the block, until Banducci moved the hungry i to the nearby International Hotel on Jackson Street in 1954.

In 1958, when the Sentinel Building's state had deteriorated and it was threatened with destruction, it was bought by Dutch-born investor Rob Moor and his wife Nella, who renovated it, renamed it to "Columbus Tower", and sold it one and a half years later at a profit to The Kingston Trio. The music group used it as their corporate headquarters during the 1960s. They built a recording studio in the basement which they used themselves and for many other artists including the We Five. 

The Kingston Trio later sold the building to film director Francis Ford Coppola, who renovated it and changed its name back to the Sentinel Building. American Zoetrope, the film studio he co-founded with George Lucas, moved into the building in 1972 and remains there as of 2016.

Tenants
Currently occupying much of the tower is Francis Ford Coppola's American Zoetrope studio.

Other tenants include independent public media producers for NPR and PBS, as well as independent sound designers for Pixar and Skywalker Sound, among others.

On the ground floor is the Cafe Zoetrope (previously Cafe Niebaum-Coppola), which has occupied part of the building since 1999. The café is a bistro and wine shop satellite of the Inglenook Estate Winery in the Napa Valley.

Gallery

See also

List of San Francisco Designated Landmarks

References

1900s in San Francisco
1907 establishments in California
American Zoetrope
Buildings and structures in San Francisco
Mass media company headquarters in the United States
North Beach, San Francisco
Office buildings completed in 1907
Office buildings in San Francisco
San Francisco Designated Landmarks
Triangular buildings
Flatiron buildings